Terrance Lamar Thomas (born December 29, 1980) is an American professional basketball player who currently plays for Deportes Castro of Chile. He played college basketball at Baylor University.

Career
He played professionally for T71 Dudelange (Luxembourg), BK Ventspils (Latvia), the Fort Worth Flyers (D-League), the Artland Dragons (Germany), the Bakersfield Jam (D-League), and   Potros ITSON (Mexico).

In 2006, Thomas represented BK Ventspils in the Baltic Basketball League All-Star Game. In 2008, he won the German Bundesliga Cup with the Artland Dragons.

In March 2010, he signed with Selçuk University of the TBL2.

On February 20, 2012, he was acquired by the Canton Charge.

In March 2013, he was acquired by the Fort Wayne Mad Ants. In November 2013, he was reacquired by the Mad Ants. On December 2, 2013, he was waived by the Mad Ants.

References

External links
NBA D-League Profile
Profile at Eurobasket.com
Baylor Bears bio

1980 births
Living people
American expatriate basketball people in Chile
American expatriate basketball people in Germany
American expatriate basketball people in Latvia
American expatriate basketball people in Luxembourg
American expatriate basketball people in Mexico
American expatriate basketball people in Turkey
American men's basketball players
Artland Dragons players
Bakersfield Jam players
BK Ventspils players
Basketball players from Texas
Baylor Bears men's basketball players
Canton Charge players
Fort Wayne Mad Ants players
Fort Worth Flyers players
Junior college men's basketball players in the United States
Lon Morris Bearcats basketball players
Potros ITSON de Obregón players
Power forwards (basketball)
Rayos de Hermosillo players
Reno Bighorns players
Small forwards
Soles de Mexicali players
Sportspeople from Waco, Texas